Aligarh is a district with hindu majority a large muslim minority (politically dominating) in the northern Indian state of Uttar Pradesh. It has been the site of communal riots in past.
At least, five to six people died as a result of rioting that began between Muslims and Hindus in the city on 5 April 2006.

Causes
The rioting started on night of 5 April when according to some people, members of the Muslim community  removed the decorations on a Hindu temple (it was the Hindu festival of Ram Navami) while another version as reported by some media suggests that riots started after some Muslims objected to the overnight celebration of Ram Navami .

Timeline
5–6 April: According to one version of the events, members of Muslim community remove decorations on a Hindu temple in view of Rama Navami leading to communal clashes in Sabzi Mandi (Vegetable Market) and Dahi Wali Galli areas of the city. Four people are killed and 13 are injured. Another more authentic version of story reported as by Reuters suggests that tensions escalated after Muslims objected to overnight celebration of Rama Navami.
6 April: Curfew was not imposed in certain areas of the city and Rapid Action Force is deployed. State of Uttar Pradesh goes on 'Red Alert' as government fears of rioting spreading to other cities.
7 April: Death toll rises to 6, as the city's Superintendent of Police S K Verma and Additional District Magistrate Satya Bhan are placed under suspension on charges of laxity. Lalji Tandon, opposition leader of the Uttar Pradesh state assembly, is detained at Kanpur while on his way to riot-affected areas. 68 people are arrested on rioting charges.
8 April: Rioting continues despite the curfew and heavy paramilitary presence in the city.

See also
1992 Bombay Riots
2002 Gujarat Riots

External links
Tensions in Aligarh as 4 persons are killed in a clash – 6 April (Outlook India)
Hindu Muslim riots leave two dead in North India –  6 April (Reuters)
BJP Claims minority "appeasement" the reason behind riots –  7 April (Outlook India)
Congress seeks judicial probe into the riots –  7 April (OneIndia)
Toll rises to 6 as riots as curfew continues –  7 April (Gauravi Gujarat)
Toll reaches 5 as Aligrah riots continue –  8 April (The Times of India)

Aligarh Riots
2006 Aligarh Riots
Aligarh Riots
Aligarh
Aligarh Riots